Ekene is a masculine given name. Notable people with the name include:

Ekene Emigo (born 1984), Nigerian footballer
Ekene Ibekwe (born 1985), American-Nigerian basketball player
Ekene Igwe (born 1988), Nigerian footballer
Ekene Ikenwa (born 1977), Nigerian footballer

Masculine given names